An annular solar eclipse occurred on August 1, 1943. A solar eclipse occurs when the Moon passes between Earth and the Sun, thereby totally or partly obscuring the image of the Sun for a viewer on Earth. An annular solar eclipse occurs when the Moon's apparent diameter is smaller than the Sun's, blocking most of the Sun's light and causing the Sun to look like an annulus (ring). An annular eclipse appears as a partial eclipse over a region of the Earth thousands of kilometres wide.
Annularity was visible in the southern Indian Ocean, with the only land being Île Amsterdam in French Madagascar (now belonging to French Southern and Antarctic Lands). A partial solar eclipse was visible from Australia, Indonesia, Malaysia, eastern Madagascar, Antarctica's Wilkes Land.

Related eclipses

Solar eclipses 1942–1946

Saros 125

Metonic series

Notes

References

1943 8 1
1943 in science
1943 8 1
August 1943 events